Jacob James Van Riper (March 8, 1838 – December 4, 1912) was an American lawyer and politician.  He served as the Attorney General of the State of Michigan from 1881 to 1885. He later served as a probate judge in Berrien County, Michigan from 1893 to 1901.  He also served on the University of Michigan Board of Regents from 1880 to 1886.

References

1838 births
1912 deaths
Michigan Attorneys General
People from Berrien County, Michigan
Regents of the University of Michigan